The 2012–13 season was the 109th season in Real Madrid Club de Fútbol's history and their 82nd consecutive season in La Liga, the top division of Spanish football. It covered a period from 1 July 2012 to 30 June 2013. Real Madrid began the season by winning the Supercopa de España, defeating Barcelona on away goals.

Real finished to Barça in La Liga, accumulating 85 points, and reached the semi-finals of the UEFA Champions League for the third year in a row, where they were eliminated by Borussia Dortmund 3–4 on aggregate. Madrid also entered the Copa del Rey in the round of 32, going on a memorable run to the final, which saw them defeat Barcelona in the semi-finals (including an emphatic 3–1 victory at Camp Nou) before losing to Atlético Madrid 1–2 a.e.t. in heartbreaking fashion, which meant that the team finished the season with one trophy out of four, despite being close to winning them all. Real Madrid faced the Blaugrana six times throughout the season, coming away with three wins, two draws, and one loss. A major transfer of the season was the signing of Luka Modrić from Tottenham Hotspur for a fee in the region of £33 million. After a loss to Atlético in the Copa del Rey final, Pérez announced the departure of José Mourinho at the end of the season by "mutual agreement".

Club

Coaching staff

Other personnel

Grounds

Official sponsors
Bwin
• Adidas
• Mahou
• Movistar
• Audi
• Emirates
• Coca-Cola
• STC
• BBVA
• Samsung
• Sanitas
• Nivea
• Solán de Cabras
• Solaria
Source: English, Spanish, Japanese

Kits
Supplier: Adidas / Sponsor: bwin

Players

Squad information

In

Total expenditure: €34 million

Out

Total income: €34 million
Net income: €0

Pre-season and friendlies

Last updated: 26 September 2012
Sources: Real Oviedo, Benfica, LA Galaxy, Santos Laguna, Milan, Celtic, Millonarios

Competitions

Supercopa de España

Last updated: 29 August 2012Source: RealMadrid.com

La Liga

League table

Results by round

Matches

Results overview

Last updated: 1 June 2013Source: RealMadrid.com, LFP.es, LigaBBVA.com, RFEF.es

Copa del Rey

Round of 32

Round of 16

Quarter-finals

Semi-finals

Final

Last updated: 17 May 2013
Source: RealMadrid.com, LFP.es

UEFA Champions League

Group stage

Knockout phase

Round of 16

Quarter-finals

Semi-finals

Last updated: 30 April 2013
Source: Matches

Statistics

Squad statistics

Goals

Last updated: 1 June 2013
Source: Match reports in Competitive matches

Disciplinary record

Start formations

Overall
{| class="wikitable" style="text-align: center"
|-
!
!Total
!Home
!Away
!Neutral
|-
|align=left| Games played          || 61 || 30 || 30 || 1
|-
|align=left| Games won             || 38 || 25 || 13 || 0
|-
|align=left| Games drawn           || 12 || 5 || 7 || 0
|-
|align=left| Games lost            || 11 || 0 || 10 || 1
|-
|align=left| Biggest win           || 5–0 vs Mallorca5–0 vs Valencia5–0 vs Levante || 5–0 vs Levante || 5–0 vs Mallorca5–0 vs Valencia || 
|-
|align=left| Biggest loss          || 1–4 vs Borussia Dortmund ||  || 1–4 vs Borussia Dortmund || 1–2 vs Atlético Madrid
|-
|align=left| Biggest win (League)  || 5–0 vs Mallorca5–0 vs Valencia || 6–2 vs Málaga || 5–0 vs Mallorca5–0 vs Valencia || –
|-
|align=left| Biggest win (Cup)     || 4–0 vs Celta Vigo || 4–0 vs Celta Vigo || 4–1 vs Alcoyano || 
|-
|align=left| Biggest win (Europe)  || 4–1 vs Ajax4–1 vs Ajax3–0 vs Galatasaray || 4–1 vs Ajax3–0 vs Galatasaray || 4–1 vs Ajax || –
|-
|align=left| Biggest loss (League) || 1–2 vs Getafe0–1 vs Sevilla0–1 vs Real Betis2–3 vs Málaga0–1 vs Granada ||  || 1–2 vs Getafe0–1 vs Sevilla0–1 vs Real Betis2–3 vs Málaga0–1 vs Granada || –
|-
|align=left| Biggest loss (Cup)    || 1–2 vs Celta Vigo1–2 vs Atlético Madrid ||  || 1–2 vs Celta Vigo || 1–2 vs Atlético Madrid
|-
|align=left| Biggest loss (Europe) || 1–4 vs Borussia Dortmund ||  || 1–4 vs Borussia Dortmund || –
|-
|align=left| Clean sheets          || 16 || 11 || 5 || 0
|-
|align=left| Goals scored          || 153 || 94 || 58 || 1
|-
|align=left| Goals conceded        || 72 || 29 || 41 || 2
|-
|align=left| Goal difference       || +81 || +65 || +17 || −1
|-
|-
|-
|align=left| Yellow cards         || 141 || 60 || 74 || 7
|-
|align=left| Red cards            || 12 || 4 || 7 || 1
|-
|align=left| Most appearances     || align=left| Cristiano Ronaldo (55) || colspan=3|–
|-
|align=left| Most minutes played  || align=left| Cristiano Ronaldo (4851) || colspan=3|–
|-
|align=left| Most goals           || align=left| Cristiano Ronaldo (55) || colspan=3|–
|-
|align=left| Most assists         || align=left| Mesut Özil (23) || colspan=3|–
|-
|align=left| Points               || 126/183 (68.85%) || 80/90 (88.89%) || 46/90 (51.11%) || 0/3 (0%)
|-
|align=left| Winning rate         || 62.3% || 83.33% || 43.33% || 0/1 (0%)

See also
 2012–13 La Liga
 2012–13 Copa del Rey
 2012 Supercopa de España
 2012–13 UEFA Champions League

References

External links

 Real Madrid at ESPN
 Real Madrid at Goal.com
 Real Madrid at Marca 
 Real Madrid at AS 
 Real Madrid at LFP 

Real Madrid CF seasons
Real Madrid
Real Madrid